Fred Gardaphé is an American literary scholar, currently a Distinguished Professor of Italian and American Studies at Queens College, City University of New York.

References

Year of birth missing (living people)
Living people
City University of New York faculty
American literary historians